7th Fighter Wing may refer to:

 Jagdgeschwader 7, Germany
 :fr:7e escadre de chasse (7th Fighter Wing), France

United States Army Air Forces
 47th Air Division, which was designated 7th Fighter Wing from June 1942 to February 1943
 7th Air Division, which was designated 7th Fighter Wing from April 1944 to December 1947